Full Surface is a record label founded in 2001, by American hip hop recording artist and record producer Kasseem "Swizz Beatz" Dean. With the help of his protégé, Cassidy, who was the 1st artist signed, the label was established. The label used to operate through Sony's J and through Universal's Interscope, Motown and Universal Motown. However, the label also had released material through joint ventures with other companies outside the Sony BMG group. It operates as a subsidiary of Warner and is distributed by Atlantic.

History
In 2001, Philadelphia-based battle rapper Cassidy, was the 1st artist to sign a recording contract with Full Surface. His March 2004 debut major label studio album Split Personality was certified Gold in America in April 2004. In 2002, it was announced Swizz Beatz signed Southern rapper Yung Wun, to the label. In a January 2003 interview with AllHipHop, Swizz Beatz said: "My new label [Full Surface] is on its way, by storm. We are moving like the army on the creep. I wanted something new so I got a mix of talent – Bounty Killa, Cassidy, Mashonda, Yung Wun, Big Tigg and Mr. Sweat – with me the beat man."

In 2005, Cleveland-based rap group Bone Thugs-n-Harmony, signed with Full Surface and secured a distribution deal with Interscope, the following year. In 2005, DMX was about to sign to Full Surface but chose Sony Urban Music instead. In April 2006, it was announced Ruff Ryders alumni Eve, signed a joint venture deal with Full Surface and Dr. Dre's Aftermath. Eve went on to release the singles "Tambourine" and "Give It to You". In October 2007, it was announced another Ruff Ryders alumni, Drag-On, signed a record deal with Full Surface.

Artists

Bone Thugs-n-Harmony 
Cassidy  
Drag-On 
Eve  
Mashonda  
Rich Hil
Swizz Beatz
Yung Wun

DJs and producers
The Individualz - A group of music producers, composed of Avenue, Joe Bravo and Jose, who have produced songs for Bone Thugs-n-Harmony, Swizz Beatz, 50 Cent, Jay-Z and Mary J. Blige.
Neo da Matrix - A producer from Philadelphia. Also signed to Ruff Ryders Entertainment and was signed with Roc-A-Fella Records.
Snags - A producer who has produced songs for Swizz Beatz and Jadakiss.
Swizz Beatz

Discography
 All releases distributed by J Records, unless otherwise noted.

References

External links
 Full Surface Records

Record labels established in 2001
American record labels
American hip hop record labels
Vanity record labels
Warner Music labels
Atlantic Records
Contemporary R&B record labels